Merrimack Valley Seaplane Base  is a privately owned, public-use seaplane base located three miles (5 km) west of the central business district of Methuen, a city in Essex County, Massachusetts, United States.

Facilities and aircraft 
Merrimack Valley Seaplane Base has two landing areas:
 Runway 1/19: 5,000 x 250 ft. (1,524 x 76 m), Surface: Water
 Runway 4/22: 4,700 x 250 ft. (1,433 x 76 m), Surface: Water

For the 12-month period ending October 1, 2006, the airport had 4,565 general aviation aircraft operations, an average of 12 per day.

References

External links 

Defunct airports in Massachusetts
Buildings and structures in Methuen, Massachusetts
Seaplane bases in the United States
Airports in Essex County, Massachusetts